"Greensleeves" is a traditional English folk song. A broadside ballad by the name "A Newe Northen Dittye of ye Ladye Greene Sleves" was registered by Richard Jones at the London Stationer's Company in September 1580, and the tune is found in several late-16th-century and early-17th-century sources, such as Ballet's MS Lute Book and Het Luitboek van Thysius, as well as various manuscripts preserved in the Seeley Historical Library in the University of Cambridge.

Form

"Greensleeves" can have a ground either of the form called a romanesca; or its slight variant, the passamezzo antico; or the passamezzo antico in its verses and the romanesca in its reprise; or of the Andalusian progression in its verses and the romanesca or passamezzo antico in its reprise. The romanesca originated in Spain and is composed of a sequence of four chords with a simple, repeating bass, which provide the groundwork for variations and improvisation.

Origin
A broadside ballad by this name was registered at the London Stationer's Company in September 1580, by Richard Jones, as "A Newe Northen Dittye of ye Ladye Greene Sleves". Six more ballads followed in less than a year, one on the same day, 3 September 1580 ("Ye Ladie Greene Sleeves answere to Donkyn hir frende" by Edward White), then on 15 and 18 September (by Henry Carr and again by White), 14 December (Richard Jones again), 13 February 1581 (Wiliam Elderton), and August 1581 (White's third contribution, "Greene Sleeves is worne awaie, Yellow Sleeves Comme to decaie, Blacke Sleeves I holde in despite, But White Sleeves is my delighte"). It then appears in the surviving A Handful of Pleasant Delights (1584) as A New Courtly Sonnet of the Lady Green Sleeves. To the new tune of Green Sleeves.

There is a persistent belief that Greensleeves was composed by Henry VIII for his lover and future queen consort Anne Boleyn. Boleyn allegedly rejected King Henry's attempts to seduce her and this rejection may be referred to in the song when the writer's love "cast me off discourteously". However, the piece is based on an Italian style of composition that did not reach England until after Henry's death, making it more likely to be Elizabethan in origin.

Lyrical interpretation

A possible interpretation of the lyrics is that Lady Green Sleeves was a promiscuous young woman, perhaps even a prostitute. At the time, the word "green" had sexual connotations, most notably in the phrase "a green gown", a reference to the grass stains on a woman's dress from engaging in sexual intercourse outdoors.

An alternative explanation is that Lady Green Sleeves was, through her costume, incorrectly assumed to be sexually promiscuous. Her "discourteous" rejection of the singer's advances supports the contention that she is not.

In Nevill Coghill's translation of The Canterbury Tales, he explains that "green [for Chaucer’s age] was the colour of lightness in love. This is echoed in 'Greensleeves is my delight' and elsewhere."

Alternative lyrics
Christmas and New Year texts were associated with the tune from as early as 1686, and by the 19th century almost every printed collection of Christmas carols included some version of words and music together, most of them ending with the refrain "On Christmas Day in the morning". One of the most popular of these is "What Child Is This?", written in 1865 by William Chatterton Dix.

Early literary references
In Shakespeare's The Merry Wives of Windsor (written c. 1597; first published in 1602), the character Mistress Ford refers twice to "the tune of 'Greensleeves'", and Falstaff later exclaims:

These allusions indicate the song was already well known at that time.

Uses of the tune

 The tune was used (as "My Lady Greensleeves") as the slow march of the London Trained Bands in the 16th and 17th Centuries. Later the 7th (City of London) Battalion London Regiment, which claimed descent from the Yellow Regiment of London Trained Bands, adopted the tune as its quick march during World War I, replacing "Austria" (to the same tune as Deutschland über Alles), which had been used until then.
 Greensleeves is the tune for the classic Christmas carol What Child Is This.
 The 17th century English ballad, Old England Grown New is a version of "Greensleeves", also sometimes known as ‘The Blacksmith’ after another broadside ballad of the time.
 Ralph Vaughan Williams incorporated Greensleeves as the song Alas, My Love, You Do Me Wrong for Mistress Ford in Act III of his 1928 opera Sir John in Love. Its contrasting middle section is founded on another folk tune: Lovely Joan. In 1934 the song was arranged for strings and harp, with Vaughan Williams's blessing, by Ralph Greaves (1889–1966); this is the familiar Fantasia on Greensleeves.
 A rendering of the tune replaced the whistled "Lassie Theme" and was used extensively in later seasons of the Lassie television show, especially during the ending credits.
 The tune was the basis for "Home in the Meadow," a recurring song throughout the 1962 epic film How the West Was Won.
 In some parts of the world, including Australia, India, Ireland, New Zealand, South Africa, United Kingdom, and areas of the United States, the "Greensleeves" tune is popular as a standard chime for ice cream vans.
 British-born founder of the ice cream company Mr Whippy, Dominic Facchino, was a "big fan" of Henry VIII, and so included a floppy Tudor hat for the company's eponymous trade mark character and chose the melody to be used as the jingle for the company's fleet of ice cream vans.
 In the musical Six, a modern retelling of the lives of the six wives of Henry VIII presented as a pop concert, Anne Boleyn makes reference to the tune in the songs "Ex-Wives" and "Six" and its supposed origins from Henry VIII.
 In Hong Kong Diploma of Secondary Education Examination, Hong Kong Advanced Level Examination and Hong Kong Certificate of Education Examination (public exams in Hong Kong), "Greensleeves" is used as background music for candidates to study the questions and tidy up their answers in listening papers.
 Pepper Ann has an episode named "GreenSleeves", where the title character pretends to be a talented musician with a  light-up keyboard that only plays "Greensleeves".
 Katey Sagal and The Forest Rangers performed a cover which appeared in 2 episodes of the FX series Sons of Anarchy (SE7E7 Greensleeves, SE7E12 Red Rose) and was included in Sons of Anarchy - Songs of Anarchy: Vol. 4 album.

References

External links 

  Public domain music recording
 
 Transcription of the lyrics from A Handful of Pleasant Delights (1584)
 
 Andrew Kuntz, The Fiddler's Companion: see under Greensleeves [2]
 Greensleeves  on TradTune.com

1580 works
English folk songs
16th-century songs
Folk ballads
Glen Campbell songs
Hymn tunes
William Ballet's Lute Book
Songs about prostitutes